Winter Queen may refer to:

 Elizabeth Stuart, Queen of Bohemia (1596–1662), wife of Frederick V of the Palatinate
 The Winter Queen (novel), a 1998 novel in the Erast Fandorin series by Boris Akunin
 The Winter Queen (1910), a historical novel by Marie Hay
 "The Winter Queen", a series of the BBC radio program Pilgrim
 Kohmi Hirose (born 1966), Japanese pop singer

See also
 White Witch
 Snow Queen (disambiguation)